Danjin Beixin station (淡金北新站) is a station of Danhai light rail, which is located at Tamsui District, New Taipei, Taiwan.

Station overview
The station building consists of three elevated floors and is constructed above Tamsui-Jinshan highway (淡金公路). It has two side platforms, and only one exit.
As its name suggests, the station is located near the intersection of Danjin Rd. (Tamsui-Jinshan highway) and Beixin Rd. And the station was opened on December 23, 2018, when the Danhai light rail begins operated.

Station design
The station is an elevated station with two side platforms.

Station layout

Around the station
 Tamkang University
 Danshui Qingge Community
 Zheng De Junior High School

References

2018 establishments in Taiwan
Railway stations opened in 2018
Danhai light rail stations